The Fighting Legion is a 1930 American pre-Code Western film directed by Harry Joe Brown and written by Bennett Cohen and Leslie Mason. The film stars Ken Maynard, Dorothy Dwan, Harry Todd, Frank Rice, Ernie Adams, and Stanley Blystone. The film was released on April 6, 1930, by Universal Pictures.

Plot
After being shot, dying Ranger Tom Dawson gives Dave Hayes his badge. When Dave Hayes arrives at Bowden to turn in the badge, he is mistaken as a Ranger. Suspicious of him, Blake and Bowle tries to put the shooting of Ranger Dawson on Dave Hayes. After fighting the gang led by Blake, Dave Hayes saves Molly and gets sworn in as a Texas Ranger.

Cast 
Ken Maynard as Dave Hayes
Tarzan as Tarzan
Dorothy Dwan as Molly Williams
Harry Todd as Dad Williams
Frank Rice as Cloudy Jones
Ernie Adams as Jack Bowie 
Stanley Blystone as Burl Edwards
J.C. Fowler as John Blake 
Robert Walker as Ranger Tom Dawson 
Les Bates as Red Hook
Slim Whitaker as Fred Hook 
Bill Nestell as Ed Hook

References

External links

1930 films
1930s English-language films
American Western (genre) films
1930 Western (genre) films
Universal Pictures films
Films directed by Harry Joe Brown
American black-and-white films
1930s American films